The 1810 Crete earthquake occurred at 22:15 on 16 February. It caused great destruction in Heraklion, some damage from Malta to northern Egypt and was felt from central Italy to Syria. 300 fatalities were reported from Candia (Heraklion).

Tectonic setting
The Hellenic arc is an arcuate tectonic feature related to the subduction of the African Plate beneath the Aegean Sea Plate. It is one of the most active seismic zones in western Eurasia and has a history of large earthquakes that also affect Egypt. Large earthquakes with epicentres near Crete and to the north of the island are typically intermediate depth events located at the subducting plate interface. Such events are often M>7, but due to their depths cause relatively little damage for their size, while being very widely felt.

Damage
The earthquake caused severe damage in Heraklion and northeastern Crete. Damage was also reported from islands in the south Aegean, Cairo, Rosetta, Alexandria in northern Egypt and on Malta. Reports of the collapse of part of the Temple of Amon at Siwa Oasis in 1811 have been also been attributed to the 1810 event, rather than a separate earthquake, which is now regarded as a 'spurious event'.

Characteristics
The earthquake was widely felt, and recorded from as far away as Cyprus, Turkey, Syria, central Italy and various parts of North Africa. The main shock is reported to have lasted for two minutes in Malta.

There are reports of a tsunami, with waves being recorded in the harbours of Malta and Alexandria and nearby canals, although these have more the character of seiches.

See also
 List of earthquakes in Greece
 List of historical earthquakes

References

Crete Earthquake, 1810
1810 in the Ottoman Empire  
1810 disasters in the Ottoman Empire 
19th century in Greece
Modern history of Crete
Earthquakes in Crete
Earthquakes in Greece
February 1810 events